Sir Jeremy Lionel Cooke (born 28 April 1949), styled The Hon. Mr Justice Cooke, is a former judge at the Queen's Bench in the High Court starting from 2001 and was presiding judge for the South Eastern Circuit from 2007 to 2011, and judge In charge of the Commercial Court from 2012 to his retirement in 2016.

Career
Educated at Whitgift School in Croydon and St Edmund Hall, Oxford, he became a solicitor in 1973 and was called to the Bar at Lincoln's Inn in 1976.

He became a QC in 1990, working at 7 King's Bench Walk, where he was noted as a leading "commercial silk" by The Lawyer, who said he specialised in "energy, insurance and reinsurance, professional negligence and shipping and maritime law." He became head of chambers in May 2000, replacing Stephen Tomlinson, who left and became a high court judge. Cooke himself became a judge in 2001, being replaced by Julian Flaux QC and Gavin Kealey QC as head of chambers. He acted as an assistant recorder 1994-8 then as a recorder 1998–2001.

High Court
Cooke was knighted in 2001, and that October he became a High Court judge, Queen's Bench Division, Commercial. With Mr Justice Bean, he became a presiding judge over the South Eastern Circuit on 1 January 2007. He was succeeded by Mr Justice Sweeney on 1 January 2012. Among the cases he has presided over as judge were the 2007 royal blackmail plot, the trial of Armel Gnango for the murder of Magda Pniewska, the trial of Roshonara Choudhry for stabbing Stephen Timms MP and the 2011 Pakistan cricket spot-fixing scandal.

Between 2013 and 2016, he presided over the case of R v Tom Hayes, which saw him hand the largest ever sentence for white collar crime in the UK. His last case was about the seizure of Hayes's assets, in which he ordered the payment of £878,806. He then retired in 2016.

Personal life
He was a member of Harlequin F.C. from 1970 to 1975. He has been vice-chairman of LICC Ltd since 1999 and was vice-president of the Lawyers' Christian Fellowship 2003–2010.

See also
Stabbing of Stephen Timms

References

External links

1949 births
British King's Counsel
Living people
English barristers
21st-century English judges
People educated at Whitgift School
Alumni of St Edmund Hall, Oxford
English King's Counsel
Knights Bachelor
Queen's Bench Division judges